Coquimbo is a port city, commune and capital of the Elqui Province, located on the Pan-American Highway, in the Coquimbo Region of Chile.

History
The area was originally occupied by indigenous people, who used it as a settlement and for fishing purposes. The natural harbour in Coquimbo was taken over by Pedro de Valdivia from Spain in 1550. The gold and copper industry in the region led to the city's importance as a port around 1840 and many Europeans especially from England settled in Coquimbo. In 1879 it was recognised as a town.

The city was on the main path of totality of the Solar eclipse of July 2, 2019.

Demographics
According to the 2002 census of the National Statistics Institute, Coquimbo had 163,036 inhabitants (79,428 men and 83,608 women). Of these, 154,316 (94.7%) lived in urban areas and 8,720 (5.3%) in rural areas. The population grew by 32.8% (40,270 persons) between the 1992 and 2002 censuses.

Administration
As a commune, Coquimbo is a fourth-level administrative division of Chile administered by a municipal council, headed by an alcalde who is directly elected every four years. The 2012-2016 alcalde is Cristian Galleguillos Vega.

Within the electoral divisions of Chile, Coquimbo is represented in the Chamber of Deputies by Pedro Velásquez (Ind.) and Matías Walker (PDC) as part of the 8th electoral district, (together with Ovalle and Río Hurtado). The commune is represented in the Senate by Gonzalo Uriarte (UDI) and Jorge Pizarro Soto (PDC) as part of the 4th senatorial constituency (Coquimbo Region).

Economy
The city is an industrial and shipping center. It is growing quickly, registering a 32.8% growth rate from 1992 to 2002. Tourism has started to develop. It is an access point for beach towns to the south, such as Guanaqueros and Tongoy. The port is still important for shipping, especially fruit and copper from mines in the region. Wine is also produced in the area.

Sports
The city has a football team called Coquimbo Unido which plays in the Chilean Primera División B. Their home games are played at the Francisco Sánchez Rumoroso Municipal Stadium, which has a capacity of 17,750 seats.  They are nicknamed "Los Piratas", because of the tradition of pirates that arrived to the coasts of Coquimbo.  Their biggest rival is Club de Deportes La Serena.

International relations

Twin towns – Sister cities
Coquimbo is twinned with:
 Elbląg, Poland

Gallery

See also 
 Asteroid 55737 Coquimbo
 Julio Alberto Mercado Illanes

References

External links

 Municipality of Coquimbo
 Travel Coquimbo
 Photo of Coquimbo
 Arriendo a Turistas
 Arriendos en Coquimbo Official website 

Communes of Chile
Port cities in Chile
1879 establishments in Chile
Capitals of Chilean provinces
Populated places in Elqui Province
Coasts of Coquimbo Region